Marjan Srbinovski (born December 8, 1974) is Macedonian basketball coach for Gostivar, of the Macedonian First League.

References

1974 births
Living people
KK Zdravlje players
Macedonian basketball coaches
Macedonian expatriate basketball people in Serbia
Macedonian men's basketball players
Small forwards
Shooting guards